Saccharopine dehydrogenase (SDH), also named Saccharopine reductase, is an enzyme involved in the metabolism of the amino acid lysine.

Saccharopine dehydrogenase may also refer to:

 Saccharopine dehydrogenase (NAD+, L-glutamate-forming)
 Saccharopine dehydrogenase (NAD+, L-lysine-forming)
 Saccharopine dehydrogenase (NADP+, L-glutamate-forming)
 Saccharopine dehydrogenase (NADP+, L-lysine-forming)

 Biology disambiguation pages